Ronald V Thurston (born 1945), is a male former boxer who competed for England.

Boxing career
He represented England and won a silver medal in the 60 kg lightweight, at the 1966 British Empire and Commonwealth Games in Kingston, Jamaica.

Four years later he represented England again at the 1970 British Commonwealth Games in Edinburgh, Scotland.

He was a member of the Raven Boxing Club in Warrington which was run by father and son duo, Herbie and young Herbie Goulding.

References

1945 births
English male boxers
Commonwealth Games medallists in boxing
Commonwealth Games silver medallists for England
Boxers at the 1966 British Empire and Commonwealth Games
Boxers at the 1970 British Commonwealth Games
Living people
Lightweight boxers
Medallists at the 1966 British Empire and Commonwealth Games